Events from the year 1954 in Denmark.

Incumbents
 Monarch – Frederick IX
 Prime minister – Hans Hedtoft

Events

Sports

Date unknown
 Lucien Gillen (LUX) and Ferdinando Terruzzi (ITA) win the Six Days of Copenhagen sox-day track cycling race.

Births
 15 June – Uffe Elbæk, politician
 10 November – Hans Kjeld Rasmussen, sports shooter
Date unknown
 Henrik Irgang Elsner, scientist and entrepreneur

Deaths
 1 June – Martin Andersen Nexø, socialist, later communist, writer (born 1869)
 6 October – Hakon Børresen, composer (born 1876)
 8 October – Morten Korch, writer of populist stories and romances (born 1876)
 29 October – Sigurd Langberg, actor (born 1897)
 11 November – Johannes Giersing, chess master (born 1872)

References

 
Denmark
Years of the 20th century in Denmark
1950s in Denmark
1954 in Europe